This is a list of player movements that occurred in the 1918-19 season of the National Hockey League.

Retirement

Trades 

transactions
National Hockey League transactions